Mexicana Universal Nuevo León (until 2016 called Nuestra Belleza Nuevo León) is a pageant in Nuevo León, Mexico, that selects that state's representative for the national Mexicana Universal pageant (before called Nuestra Belleza México). Nuevo León is considered one of the strongest states in Mexican pageantry, as they are almost always among the finalists. Nuevo León has been classified to the semifinals, with the exception of the edition of 2002, the temple this year where not only classify

Nuevo León is the State that has produced more crowns in the history, with 11 crowns. The State Organization has produced four Nuestra Belleza México in 1997, 1998, 2005 and 2012, three  Nuestra Belleza Mundo México in 1995, 2007 and 2010, three designated as Nuestra Belleza Internacional México in 2007, 2009 and 2013 and two of them won the title of Miss International the years (2007 and 2009) and one Mexicana Hispanoamericana in 2020.

In 2010 Cynthia de la Vega won the crown of Nuestra Belleza Mundo México but she was dethroned on July 29, 2011 for disorderly conduct and seemingly overweight causing controversy worldwide.

Titleholders
Below are the names of the annual titleholders of Mexicana Universal Nuevo León, listed in ascending order, and their final placements in the Mexicana Universal after their participation, until 2017 the names was Nuestra Belleza Nuevo León.

 Competes in Miss Universe.
 Competes in Miss World.
 Competed in Reina Hispanoamericana.

1 They were selected by The Nuestra Belleza México Organization to represent Mexico in Miss International beauty pageant, winning the Title in 2007 and 2009.

Designated Contestants
As of 2000, isn't uncommon for some States to have more than one delegate competing simultaneously in the national pageant. The following Nuestra Belleza Nuevo León contestants were invited to compete in Nuestra Belleza México. Some have placed higher than the actual State winners.

External links
Official Website

See also
Miss Nuevo León
Miss Earth Nuevo León

Nuestra Belleza México
Nuevo León